Lozay is a commune in the Charente-Maritime department in southwestern France.

Population

Sights
 Saint Peter's is a 12th-century fortified church which was classed as a Monument Historique (Historic Monument) in 1953. A high altar and tabernacle with a candle holder consisting of two figures in gilded wood adorns the interior.  This has been protected since November 30, 1984.
 A washhouse and fountain are located below the village, in Puy Bardon.
 The Essouvert wood is located 1.5 km south-east of the village.
 A replica of the lantern of the dead of Fenioux was built on the rest area from the A10 Paris-Bordeaux highway in 1994.

See also
 Communes of the Charente-Maritime department

References

External links
 

Communes of Charente-Maritime
Charente-Maritime communes articles needing translation from French Wikipedia